The Color of Love: Jacey's Story is a 2000 American drama television film directed by Sheldon Larry, written by Nancey Silvers, and starring Gena Rowlands and Louis Gossett Jr. It aired on CBS on March 19, 2000.

Plot
A white grandmother and a black grandfather, not married to each other, must overcome their differences to raise their suddenly orphaned granddaughter.

Cast
 Gena Rowlands as Georgia Porter
 Louis Gossett Jr. as Lou Hastings
 Penny Fuller as Madeleine Porter 
 Stella Parton as Ellen Fuller
 Helen Floyd as Betty Watson 
 Penny Bae Bridges as Jacey Hastings

Production
Filming took place in Wilmington, North Carolina.

Reception
Ramin Zahed of Variety gave the film a mixed review, stating: "Watching the sentimental telepic "The Color of Love: Jacey’s Story," feels a lot like visiting your grandma and eating her homemade pie. The experience is terribly predictable, but you go through with it, because of the comfort it offers."

For her performance, Gena Rowlands was nominated for a Primetime Emmy Award in the category of Outstanding Lead Actress in a Miniseries or a Movie. The film was also nominated for two Satellite Awards: one for Gossett Jr. in the category of Best Performance by an Actor in a Miniseries or a Motion Picture Made for Television, and one for Rowlands in the category of Best Performance by an Actress in a Miniseries or a Motion Picture Made for Television.

References

External links
 
 The Color of Love: Jacey's Story at FilmAffinity
 

2000 television films
2000 films
2000 drama films
2000s American films
2000s English-language films
American drama television films
CBS network films
Films directed by Sheldon Larry
Films scored by J. A. C. Redford
Films shot in North Carolina